The Florida Marlins' 2000 season was the eighth season for the Major League Baseball (MLB) franchise in the National League.  It would begin with the team attempting to improve on their season from 1999.  Their manager was John Boles. They played home games at Pro Player Stadium. They finished with a record of 79-82, 3rd in the NL East.

Offseason
December 13, 1999: Johan Santana was traded by the Florida Marlins with cash to the Minnesota Twins for Jared Camp (minors).
December 13, 1999: Bruce Aven was traded by the Florida Marlins to the Pittsburgh Pirates for Brant Brown.

Regular season
On September 10, 2000, Randy Johnson recorded his 3000th strikeout as he struck out Florida Marlins' third baseman Mike Lowell.

Season standings

Record vs. opponents

Transactions
April 5, 2000: Randall Simon was signed as a free agent with the Florida Marlins.
May 8, 2000: Randall Simon was released by the Florida Marlins.
July 31, 2000: Henry Rodriguez was traded by the Chicago Cubs to the Florida Marlins for Ross Gload and Dave Noyce (minors).

Citrus Series
2000 Citrus Series split 3-3
June 9- @ Devil Rays 6- Marlins 4
June 10- Marlins 5- @ Devil Rays 1
June 11- @ Devil Rays 7- Marlins 6
July 7- Devil Rays 8- @ Marlins 3
July 8- @ Marlins 6- Devil Rays 5
July 9- @ Marlins 10- Devil Rays 9

Roster

Player stats

Batting

Starters by position 
Note: Pos = Position; G = Games played; AB = At bats; H = Hits; Avg. = Batting average; HR = Home runs; RBI = Runs batted in

Other batters 
Note: G = Games played; AB = At bats; H = Hits; Avg. = Batting average; HR = Home runs; RBI = Runs batted in

Pitching

Starting pitchers 
Note: G = Games pitched; IP = Innings pitched; W = Wins; L = Losses; ERA = Earned run average; SO = Strikeouts

Other pitchers 
Note: G = Games pitched; IP = Innings pitched; W = Wins; L = Losses; ERA = Earned run average; SO = Strikeouts

Relief pitchers 
Note: G = Games pitched; W = Wins; L = Losses; SV = Saves; ERA = Earned run average; SO = Strikeouts

Farm system

References

External links
2000 Florida Marlins at Baseball Reference
2000 Florida Marlins at Baseball Almanac

Miami Marlins seasons
Florida Marlins season
Miami